Reuland is a surname. Notable people with the surname include:

Gina Reuland (born 1992), Luxembourgian pole vaulter
Konrad Reuland (1987–2016), American football player
Robert Reuland (born 1963), American novelist and attorney